Mikhail Valeryevich Ruslyakov (born 3 March 1972 in Vladivostok) is a former Russian football player.

References

1972 births
Sportspeople from Vladivostok
Living people
Soviet footballers
FC Luch Vladivostok players
Russian footballers
Russian Premier League players
FC Irtysh Omsk players
FC Sheksna Cherepovets players
FC Uralets Nizhny Tagil players
Association football midfielders